Wang Jingyao (usually referred to in the media as Jingyao Wang; born September 27, 1990) is a Chinese beauty pageant contestant from Shandong.

Miss Universe 2009
Wang represented China at Miss Universe 2009, which was held at the Atlantis Paradise Island, in Nassau, Bahamas on August 23, 2009. She was chosen as Miss Congeniality by her fellow contestants.

References

1990 births
Living people
Chinese beauty pageant winners
Miss Universe 2009 contestants
People from Jinan